The 1972 Sugar Bowl (January) was the 38th edition of the college football bowl game, played at Tulane Stadium in New Orleans, Louisiana, on Saturday, January 1. It featured the third-ranked Oklahoma Sooners of the Big Eight Conference and the #5 Auburn Tigers of the Southeastern Conference (SEC). The favored Sooners won 40–22.

This was the last Sugar Bowl played in January until 1977, as it moved to New Year's Eve night for the next four editions.

Teams

Although the runner-up in their respective conferences, both teams were ranked in the top five in the polls, as this game was a tale of duality. Both teams averaged over 300 yards on the season, though Oklahoma's record setting 566 yards a game was more notable than Auburn's 393. Both teams started the season 9–0, with both teams losing late in the season to their respective arch-rivals, who were likewise undefeated and untied.

Oklahoma

On Thanksgiving day, Oklahoma lost a late lead to visiting #1 Nebraska in a memorable game, and fell from second to third in the rankings. This was the Sooners' fourth appearance in the Sugar Bowl, but first since 1951.

Auburn

Auburn lost 31–7 to Alabama in late November; they remained at fifth in the rankings and were invited to their first Sugar Bowl. Alabama and Nebraska matched up in the Orange Bowl for the national championship, essentially making this a runner-up game.

Game summary
Televised by ABC, the kickoff was in the morning at 

Though he threw only four passes (with one completion), Oklahoma quarterback Jack Mildren used his legs to help win the game and the MVP award, running thirty times for 149 yards and three touchdowns. Leon Crosswhite helped start the scoring with a touchdown run on OU's first drive. Mildren scored three straight touchdown runs to make it 25–0 by the second quarter and after a punt return touchdown by Joe Wylie, it was  

Sooner kicker John Carroll made a 53-yard field goal before Auburn finally got on the scoreboard with a touchdown run by fullback Harry Unger, and the score was  after three quarters. The Sooners responded as halfback Greg Pruitt made it an even forty points, and Auburn then scored two late touchdowns. The first was a pass from Heisman Trophy winner Pat Sullivan to Sandy Cannon with less than four minutes remaining, and Unger added another on the ground to complete the scoring at  Oklahoma had more yards, fewer turnovers (2 to 3), and more first downs, and won their first Sugar Bowl

Scoring
First quarter
Oklahoma – Leon Crosswhite 4-yard run (kick failed)
Oklahoma – Jack Mildren 5-yard run (John Carroll kick)
Oklahoma – Joe Wylie 71-yard punt return (pass failed)

Second quarter
Oklahoma – Mildren 4-yard run (run failed)
Oklahoma – Mildren 7-yard run (pass failed)

Third quarter
Oklahoma – Carroll 53-yard field goal
Auburn  – Harry Unger 2-yard run (Gardner Jett kick)

Fourth quarter
Oklahoma – Greg Pruitt 2-yard run (kick failed)
Auburn  – Sandy Cannon 12-yard pass from Pat Sullivan (Jett kick)
Auburn  – Unger 1-yard run (David Beck run)

Statistics
{| class=wikitable style="text-align:center"
! Statistics !! Oklahoma  !!   Auburn  
|-
| align=left|First Downs || 28|| 15
|-
| align=left|Rushes–Yards|| 87–439|| 19–40
|-
| align=left|Yards Passing || 11|| 250
|-
| align=left|Passes || 1–4–0 || 20–45–2
|-
| align=left|Total Yards || 91–450|| 64–290
|-
| align=left|Punts-Average || 5–35.4|| 5–48.6
|-
| align=left|Fumbles–Lost ||5–2|| 5–1
|-
| align=left|Turnovers|| 2|| 3
|-
| align=left|Penalties–Yards ||3–12|| 0–0
|}

Aftermath
Oklahoma moved up to second in the final AP poll, followed by Colorado, the only time the top three teams were from the same conference.  to fourth and Auburn dropped 

The Sooners returned to the Sugar Bowl in December and defeated Penn State, becoming the only school to win the same bowl game twice in a  calendar year. Auburn waited twelve years for their next Sugar Bowl, a victory over Michigan.

References

Sugar Bowl
Sugar Bowl
Auburn Tigers football bowl games
Oklahoma Sooners football bowl games
Sugar Bowl
Sugar Bowl